Jaime "Jimmy" Eulert Pinto (born 1 January 1952) is a retired Peruvian Paralympic swimmer who competed in international level events. He is Peru's most successful Paralympian.

Eulert became quadriplegic after he was struck by a car while riding a motorbike with a friend in the Chorrillos District.

References

1952 births
Living people
Sportspeople from Lima
Paralympic swimmers of Peru
Swimmers at the 1996 Summer Paralympics
Swimmers at the 2000 Summer Paralympics
Swimmers at the 2004 Summer Paralympics
Swimmers at the 2008 Summer Paralympics
Medalists at the 1996 Summer Paralympics
Medalists at the 2000 Summer Paralympics
Medalists at the 2004 Summer Paralympics
Medalists at the 2003 Parapan American Games
Medalists at the 2007 Parapan American Games
Peruvian male freestyle swimmers
Peruvian male backstroke swimmers
S3-classified Paralympic swimmers
Medalists at the World Para Swimming Championships
20th-century Peruvian people